Gravity is the début album of Alejandro Escovedo, released in 1992. Heinz Geissler and John Kunz were the executive producers.

Critical reception
Trouser Press wrote: "In the clarified artistic vision of a mature musician with a broken heart, a spiritual sense of his place in the world and a rich, resonant voice, Escovedo devised an electric folk idiom ... powerfully suited to the poetic hair shirt he donned."

Track listing
All tracks composed by Alejandro Escovedo
"Paradise" – 4:16
"Broken Bottle" – 3:53
"One More Time" – 3:46
"By Eleven" – 4:03
"Bury Me" – 5:24
"Five Hearts Breaking" – 4:10
"Oxford" – 4:25
"Last to Know" – 5:00
"She Doesn't Live Here Anymore" – 4:24
"Pyramid of Tears" – 4:00
"Gravity/Falling Down Again" – 7:18

Personnel
Alejandro Escovedo	 - 	vocal, acoustic guitar
Turner Stephen Bruton	 - 	slide guitar, electric slide guitar, electric guitar, acoustic guitar, mandolin, vocal harmony
Chris Knight	 - 	keyboards
Barry "Frosty" Smith	 - 	drums, percussion
Dennis Kenmore - drums
Rick Poss	 - 	electric twelve-string guitar
Terry Wilson	 - 	bass
John Hagen	 - 	cello
Marty Muse	 - 	pedal steel guitar
Thierry Le Coz	 - 	electric guitar
Bill Ginn	 - 	piano
Lou Ann Barton	 - 	vocal harmony
Bill Averbach	 - 	trumpet on "Bury Me"
J. D. Foster	 - 	vocal harmony
Cid Sanchez	 - 	lead guitar on "Oxford"
Spencer Starnes - double bass on "She Doesn't Live Here Anymore"
Bruce & Charlie Robison	 - 	vocal harmonies
Dennis Kenmore, Jay Hudson, T.S. Bruton, Chris Knight, "Big Wave" Dave McNair, J.D. Foster, Alejandro Escovedo	 - 	The Cappuccino Choir
Maya Escovedo, Megan Ewing	 - 	The Screaming Me Me's
Technical
Heinz Geissler, John T. Kunz - executive producer
Kathy Marcus - art direction, design
Dana Lee Smith - illustration

References

1992 debut albums
Alejandro Escovedo albums